The Halifax Waterfront Boardwalk is a public footpath located on the Halifax Harbour waterfront in Halifax, Nova Scotia, Canada.

Constructed of durable heavy timber, the Halifax boardwalk is open to the public 24 hours a day. The boardwalk also includes shops at Bishop's Landing and the  Historic Properties buildings as well as the "Cable Wharf", a former cable ship terminal now used as a tour boat base for several vessels formerly including Theodore Too. The final working vessels to regularly operate from the waterfront were pilot boats which were based at a small pier at the foot of Sackville Street, but in late 2020 their base moved to a wharf in Dartmouth near the foot of the Macdonald Bridge. The former tug and pilotage wharves have since been partially demolished and refurbished to make way for new public amenities.

The boardwalk's southern terminus is at Halifax Seaport. It stretches northwards along the coast for approximately  before it terminates in front of Casino Nova Scotia at its northern terminus. Three notable museums are located on the waterfront. The Pier 21 immigration museum is located at the southern terminus. The Maritime Museum of the Atlantic at the boardwalk's centre and includes the museum ship . Just south of Acadia is the summer home of the museum ship .

The waterfront boardwalk is administered by the Waterfront Development Corporation Limited, a provincial crown corporation located at the Cable Wharf.

Points of interest

Ordered from north to south:

 Casino Nova Scotia
 Purdy's Wharf
 Marriott Harbourfront Hotel
 Historic Properties (Halifax)
 Water Street Ferry Terminal
 Murphy's on the Water and the Cable Wharf
 
 Maritime Museum of the Atlantic
 Sackville Landing
  (summer months)
 Tug wharves and Foundation Franklin monument
 Bishop's Landing
 Nova Scotia Power Headquarters
 Halifax Seaport
 Samuel Cunard Monument
 Halifax Farmers' Market
 NSCAD University (Port Campus)
 Garrison Brewery
 Cruise ship terminal
 Pier 21 (home to the Canadian Museum of Immigration)
 Cunard Centre (events centre)

Future developments
There are still several vacant lots along the waterfront. The Queen's Landing project, under construction, will fill in a large empty space between the Ferry Terminal and the Maritime Museum of the Atlantic. Other planned projects include Sackville Landing as well as the Salter Street Block Parking Lot redevelopment, which includes parks, a winter garden, a hotel, retail, and condominiums.

References

 Home and Abroad. Halifax Waterfront Boardwalk

Buildings and structures in Halifax, Nova Scotia
Tourist attractions in Halifax County, Nova Scotia
Redeveloped ports and waterfronts in Canada